Nandini Goud (born 1967) is an Indian painter and printmaker from Hyderabad, India. She received various awards and fellowships such as Junior Fellowship  for painting  from the Department of Culture of the Government of India for 1998 to 2000 and National Scholarship in 1995.

Biography 
Nandini Goud is the daughter of senior artist Laxma Goud and was born in 1967 in Medak, Andhra Pradesh, India. She did her Bachelor's in Painting and master's degree in Printmaking from the Faculty of Fine Arts at the M.S University in Baroda.

Her Works
Goud's work depicts and captures typical street living in hyderabad, social life of rural people along with their domestic animals namely cats, goats etc.,. Her works also portrays urban descriptions focussing on interiors of households such as vases of flowers, fruits on the table, and makeup equipment etc.,.

In her own words of Nandini Goud, she says "My effort to come to grips with the aesthetic issues involved in painting the Indian city focused mainly on the role of space in pictorial organization".

Exhibitions 
Her paintings were exhibited along with Indian legends such as M.F. Husain, Shamshad Husain, and Laxma Goud such as Parampara, Feminine Muse, Curiosity Gallery.

 Art Alive Gallery, Delhi, INDIA in 2007
 View Exhibition Emerging India at Art Alive Gallery
 Guild Art Gallery in 1998
 Vadehra Art Gallery, New Delhi in 1995
 Renaissance Art Gallery, Bangalore in 1994
 Gallery Espace, New Delhi in 1992

References 

 http://www.new.shrishtiart.com/Artist_Profile.aspx?ArtistId=181 
 https://web.archive.org/web/20110721154200/http://www.greaterhyderabad.co.in/article/Arts/9852/
 https://web.archive.org/web/20110713025207/http://www.indianartcollectors.com/view-details.php?arid=4160
 http://www.affordindianart.com/pages/nandinigoud.html
 https://web.archive.org/web/20080608075142/http://www.fiidaaart.com/artists/nandini_goud.htm
 http://www.guildindia.com
 https://web.archive.org/web/20111004025012/http://www.gallerythreshold.com/artist.aspx?artist_id=27
 http://www.goudsinfo.com
 https://web.archive.org/web/20120301113121/http://www.galleriaart.net/artists_bio.asp?aid=275

Living people
1967 births
20th-century Indian painters
20th-century Indian women artists
20th-century printmakers
21st-century Indian women artists
Telugu people
People from Medak
Artists from Hyderabad, India
Indian women painters
Indian women contemporary artists
Indian contemporary painters
Painters from Andhra Pradesh
Women printmakers
Women artists from Andhra Pradesh